The Astra Model 44 is a large, double-action revolver chambered in .41 Magnum, .44 Magnum, or .45 Long Colt with a six-shot, swing-out cylinder, similar in design and features to the Smith & Wesson Model 29 N-frame revolver.

It was manufactured in Spain and imported into the United States by Interarms under catalog number 55000. It was sold through distributor Lew Horton in the 1980s.

A shorter barrel (2¾") (aka snub nose) variant called the "Terminator" was produced by the John Jovino Gun Shop. Due to the short barrel, this pistol features fairly heavy felt recoil and a large muzzle flash.  Sales of the variant stopped in 1989 due to limited demand.

See also
 Llama Super Comanche

References 

Revolvers of Spain
.44 Magnum firearms
.45 Colt firearms